Pholedrine (Paredrinol, Pulsotyl, Veritol), also known as 4-hydroxy-N-methylamphetamine (4-HMA), 4-hydroxymethamphetamine, and para-hydroxymethamphetamine, is a drug that stimulates the sympathetic nervous system. It is administered as a topical eye drop form for the purpose of dilating the pupil and can be used to diagnose Horner's syndrome.

See also 

 Norpholedrine
 Tyramine
 Hordenine

References 

Methamphetamines
Phenols
Norepinephrine-dopamine releasing agents